The Sinclair Enterprise was a calculator introduced in 1977 by Sinclair Radionics.

History
The Enterprise calculator was introduced in October 1977 by Sinclair Radionics with the Enterprise Programmable following in July 1978.  At that time Sinclair was being financially assisted by the National Enterprise Board, which the calculators name references.  In July 1978 Sinclair introduced the Enterprise Programmable calculator. Neither calculator was a great success and ended up being sold at a loss.

Design

References

Citations

Sources
 

Sinclair calculators